Kevin Andrés Zenon (born 30 July 2001) is an Argentine professional footballer who plays as a midfielder for Unión Santa Fe.

Career
Zenon spent his early career with Goya teams Central, Huracán and San Ramón. In 2018, after a trial with Newell's Old Boys, Zenon joined Unión Santa Fe; following a recommendation from Lionel Messi's father, Jorge. He made the breakthrough into Unión's first-team in October 2020, featuring in friendlies primarily as a left-back. His senior debut arrived on 29 October in a Copa Sudamericana home loss to Ecuadorian club Emelec; he was substituted on midway through the second half in place of Ezequiel Cañete. Zenon's first start came on 1 November against Arsenal de Sarandí in the Copa de la Liga Profesional.

Style of play
Zenon is definitively a midfielder, though is capable of playing at left-back and as a winger.

Career statistics
.

Notes

References

External links

2001 births
Living people
Sportspeople from Corrientes Province
Argentine footballers
Association football midfielders
Unión de Santa Fe footballers
Argentine people of French descent